The 1976 International cricket season was from May 1976 to August 1976.

Season overview

International tours

West Indies in England 

The West Indies travelled to England on the back of a busy schedule which had seen them play Australia and India during the 1975–76 season, which led some commentators to speculate that they might be jaded. The first two Test matches were drawn; the Wisden editor blamed the West Indies' lack of a spin bowler as preventing them from winning the first match, while in the second match a whole day was lost to rain with England on top. The West Indies won the three remaining Test matches to win the series 3–0, largely due to their fast bowlers. Viv Richards scored two double centuries, and finished as the leading run-scorer on either team, despite missing the second Test with an injury.

In the three-match One Day International series, Richards was again dominant in the first two games, scoring 119 and 97 to help the West Indies to victories. In the third ODI, when Richards was dismissed without scoring, Gordon Greenidge scored 42 and Clive Lloyd made 79 to guide their side to a 50-run win. The last two matches were each affected by rain; the second ODI was spread over two days, while the third utilised the reserve day after no play was possible at all on first day.

Australia women in England 

The Australia national women's cricket team was invited to England to help celebrate the fiftieth anniversary of the Women's Cricket Association.

Ireland in Scotland

England Young Cricketers in the West Indies

Notes

References

Bibliography

1976 in cricket